Bangladesh Sangbad Sangstha (BSS) is the news agency of Bangladesh. BBS was established on 1 January, 1972 by the Government of Bangladesh soon after the Liberation War. Abul Kalam Azad is the current managing director and chief editor of the agency.

References

Mass media companies established in 1972
News agencies based in Bangladesh
1972 establishments in Bangladesh
Government agencies of Bangladesh
Ministry of Information and Broadcasting (Bangladesh)